The 2019 Thai FA Cup Final was the final match of the 2019 Thai FA Cup, the 26th season of a Thailand's football tournament organised by Football Association of Thailand. It was played at the Leo Stadium in Pathum Thani, Thailand on 2 November 2019, between Ratchaburi Mitr Phol a big team from the Western part and Port a big team from the capital of Thailand.

Road to the final

Note: In all results below, the score of the finalist is given first (H: home; A: away; T1: Clubs from Thai League 1; T2: Clubs from Thai League 2; T3: Clubs from Thai League 3; T4: Clubs from Thai League 4.

Match

The first half of the final was an engrossing affair, with both sides being denied a goal each by VAR.

Port's Pakorn Prempak was sent off in the dying moments following a VAR review.

While Port were comparatively more enterprising in their opponents' half, Ratchaburi looked dangerous on the few counter-attacks they launched.

Pakorn saw his shot sail over the bar early in the match before Bordin Phala was twice denied by Ratchaburi defenders, including one by their skipper Philip Roller in the seventh minute.

Ratchaburi attacks were mostly thwarted by a solid Port defence. Lossemy Karaboue came the closest only to see his attempt being warded off by Port goalkeeper Worawut Srisupha.

Port found the net in the 25th minute but the goal was scratched off the scoresheet following a VAR intervention.

Sergio Suarez picked up a through pass to race into the box and slide the ball across from the right to Sumanya Purisay to fire it home.

However, a consultation with the referee on TV revealed that Suarez had been in an off-side position when he took the pass from Pakorn, who was impressive in his role as a playmaker for the Khlong Toei-based club.

Then it was Ratchaburi's turn to become a victim of VAR's sharp eye.

Worawut fumbled a Steeven Langil cross from the left and Karaboue was quick to pounce on the mistake by Port's custodian to tap it into the net and kick-start celebrations from the Ratchaburi fans.

However, the match referee turned to the VAR officials as before the ball had sailed on to Langil on the left flank, Karaboue had skidded into Worawut and it was deemed a foul.

Details

Assistant referees:
 Poonsawat Samransuk
 Worapong Prasartsri
Fourth official:
 Wiwat Jumpa-on
Assistant VAR:
 Sivakorn Pu-udom
 Rawut Nakarit
Match Commissioner:
 Ekachai Tanaddernkao
Referee Assessor:
 Preecha Kangram
General Coordinator:
 Jetsada Dujnakee

Winner

See also
 2019 Thai League 1
 2019 Thai League 2
 2019 Thai League 3
 2019 Thai League 4
 2019 Thai FA Cup
 2019 Thai League Cup

References

External links
Thai FA cup snapshot from Thai League official website

2019
2